Amzi Clarence Dixon (July 6, 1854 – June 14, 1925) was a Baptist pastor, Bible expositor, and evangelist who was popular during the late 19th and the early 20th centuries.  With R.A. Torrey, he edited an influential series of essays, published as The Fundamentals (1910–15), which gave Christian fundamentalism its name.

Early life
Amzi Clarence Dixon was born on a farm near Shelby, North Carolina, on July 6, 1854, to Thomas Jeremiah Frederick Dixon, a Baptist preacher, and Amanda Elvira McAfee Dixon.

While still young, A. C. Dixon believed he had been called to preach, and in 1875, he graduated from Wake Forest College, at that time in Wake Forest, North Carolina.

Career
Dixon was ordained in 1876 and immediately began serving as pastor of two country churches. He also pastored in Chapel Hill and Asheville before he attended the Southern Baptist Theological Seminary (then in Greenville, South Carolina), where he was a student of John A. Broadus.

Thereafter, he served at Immanuel Church, Baltimore (1883–1890), Hanson Place Baptist Church, Brooklyn (1890-1900), Ruggles Street Church, Boston (1901–1906), the Moody Church, Chicago (1906–1911), and the Metropolitan Tabernacle, London (1911–1919). In Brooklyn, he often rented the Brooklyn Opera House for Sunday afternoon evangelistic services. In Boston, Dixon also taught at the Gordon Bible and Missionary Training School (now Gordon College), and he published Old and New, an attack on the Social Gospel movement.

In 1906, he moved to Chicago's Chicago Avenue Church, founded by Dwight L. Moody. Two years later, the church changed its name to the Moody Church. In Chicago, he also became a syndicated columnist, with his writings appearing in such newspapers as The Baltimore Sun, the Boston Herald, and the Chicago Daily News. In 1911, he assumed the ministry of London's Metropolitan Tabernacle, formerly pastored by Charles Spurgeon, and he often spoke at large Bible conferences. He retired in 1919, but in 1922, he returned to the ministry as the first pastor of University Baptist Church, Baltimore, Maryland.

Dixon was a staunch advocate of Fundamentalist Christianity during its developmental period. His preaching was often fiery and direct, confronting various forms of Protestant apostasy, Roman Catholicism, Henry Ward Beecher's liberalism, Robert Ingersoll's agnosticism, Christian Science, Unitarianism, and higher criticism of the Bible.

Later life
Several months before his death, he suffered chronic back pain and suspended his service at University Baptist Church. He died of a heart attack on June 14, 1925.

Works

 The Person and Ministry of the Holy Spirit (1890)
 Milk and Meat (1893; new edition, 1913)
 The Holy Spirit in Life and Service (1895)
 Lights and Shadows of American Life (1898)
 Present Day Life and Religion; A Series of Sermons on Cardinal Doctrines and Popular Sins (1905)
 The Young Convert's Problems and their Solution (1906)
 Heaven on Earth (1896)
 The Lights and Shadows of American Life (1903)
 The Christian Science Delusion (1903)
 Present-Day Life and Religion (1905)
 Evangelism, Old and New (1905)
 The Young Convert's Problems (1906)
 The Bright Side of Life and Other Sermons (1914)
 The Glories of the Cross and Other Addresses (1914)
 Reconstruction (1919)
 The Birth of Christ, the Incarnation of God (1919)
 Why I Am a Christian (1921)
 Higher Critic Myths and Moths (1921)

References

External links

Biographical information
More biographical information
Some sermons by A.C. Dixon
Another sermon

1854 births
1925 deaths
People from Shelby, North Carolina
Wake Forest University alumni
Southern Baptist Theological Seminary alumni
American theologians
Christian fundamentalists
Critics of the Catholic Church
Baptists from North Carolina
Baptist ministers from the United States
American expatriates in England